This page presents the results of the Women's 9-man Volleyball Tournament at the 1962 Asian Games, which was held from 29 to 31 August 1962 in Jakarta, Indonesia.

Results

|}

Final standing

References
 Results

External links
OCA official website

Women's Volleyball